Ben Sanchez is a regular-footed American skateboarder from San Francisco, California.

Skateboarding 
After skating the Embarcadero daily for years, Sanchez was sponsored briefly by Blind, before joining the Chocolate team in 1994.

Skate videos 
Sanchez has appeared in several Girl Distribution skate films.

Sponsors 
Life, Blind, Chocolate

Post-Skateboarding 
Sanchez had a short, but memorable, career. First sponsored in 1994, Sanchez retired from skating by 1997. He transitioned to a career as an auto mechanic, in order to better support his child.

References

External links 
 Ben Sanchez - Mouse - 1996

American skateboarders
Living people
1975 births

People from San Francisco
Sportspeople from San Francisco
American sportspeople of Mexican descent